Kunes is a village in Lebesby Municipality in Troms og Finnmark county, Norway.  The small village is located along Norwegian County Road 98, on the shore of the innermost arm of the Laksefjorden.  Kunes Chapel is located in this village.

References

Villages in Finnmark
Lebesby
Populated places of Arctic Norway